Wilcox House, or Wilcox Farm or Wilcox Farmhouse, may refer to:

in Canada
Wilcox House, Mississauga, Ontario, one of the oldest buildings and structures in Mississauga

in the United States 
Maria Antonia Arguella Wilcox House, Los Angeles, California, a contributing property in North University Park Historic District
Benjamin Wilcox House, San Juan Bautista, San Benito County, California, listed on the National Register of Historic Places (NRHP)
Joseph Wilcox House, included in Highland Historic District (Middletown, Connecticut)
Josiah Wilcox House, Greenwich, Connecticut, NRHP-listed
Albert Spencer Wilcox Beach House, Hanalei, Hawaii, NRHP-listed
Albert Spencer Wilcox Building, Lihue, Hawaii, NRHP-listed
Andrew Wilcox House, Jackson, Jackson County, Michigan, NRHP-listed
Ansley Wilcox House, Buffalo, New York, included in the Theodore Roosevelt Inaugural National Historic Site
Wilcox Octagon House, Camillus, New York, NRHP-listed
Richard T.C. Lord and William V. Wilcox House, Des Moines, Iowa, NRHP-listed
Swart-Wilcox House, Oneonta, Otsego County, New York, NRHP-listed
W. G. Wilcox House, Plattsburgh, New York, NRHP-listed
Wilcox Farmhouse (Three Mile Bay, New York), NRHP-listed
Gray-Brownlow-Wilcox House, Brinkleyville, Halifax County, North Carolina
Jacob Wilcox Farm, Amlin, Franklin County, Ohio, NRHP-listed in Franklin County
James Wilcox House, Amlin, Franklin County, Ohio, NRHP-listed in Franklin County
Wilcox-Mills House, Marietta, Washington County, Ohio, NRHP-listed in Washington County
Gilbert-Wilcox House, Worthington, Franklin County, Ohio, NRHP-listed in Franklin County 
Theodore B. Wilcox Country Estate, in Multnomah County near Portland, Oregon, NRHP-listed in Multnomah County
Joseph Stanton House, also known as Wilcox Tavern and General Stanton Monument, Charlestown, Rhode Island, NRHP-listed
Wilcox-Graves House, Georgetown, Williamson County, Texas, NRHP-listed in Williamson County
D. K. and Inez Wilcox House, Georgetown, Williamson County, Texas, NRHP-listed in Williamson County
James D. Wilcox House, Farmington, Davis County, Utah, NRHP-listed in Davis County
Wilcox-Cutts House, Orwell, Addison County, Vermont, NRHP-listed in Addison County
Charles Wilcox House, Yakima, Yakima County, Washington, NRHP-listed in Yakima County
Walter D. Wilcox House (better known as the Whittemore House), listed on the NRHP-listed in Washington, D.C. 
Roy Wilcox House, Eau Claire, Wisconsin, NRHP-listed in Eau Claire County

See also
Wilcox Building (disambiguation)